Scheinfeld is a town in the Neustadt (Aisch)-Bad Windsheim district, in Bavaria, Germany. It is situated 14 km northwest of Neustadt (Aisch), and 40 km east of Würzburg. Schloss Schwarzenberg is adjacent to the town. The town is home to an Adidas testing factory.

From 1946 to 1949 a displaced persons camp was in operation at Scheinfeld. About 1,500 Lithuanians were brought there from the Regensburg camp. The camp was a center of Lithuanian culture and also had a short lived community currency.

References

External links

 Official town website
 Website with information on the Lithuanian refugees

Gallery

Neustadt (Aisch)-Bad Windsheim
Schwarzenberg family